Suzannah Claire "Suzy" Lishman CBE (born ) was the President of the Royal College of Pathologists 2014–2017.

Career 

Lishman was educated at King's Ely, and Girton College, Cambridge, and after qualifying in medicine specialised in histopathology, being appointed a consultant in 1999. She has been an officer of the Royal College of Pathologists since 2005 and raised the profile of the specialty tremendously by introducing public engagement initiatives such as National Pathology Week. She has collaborated with the Science Museum, Royal Institution, Royal Society and Cheltenham Science Festival. She was elected President of the Royal College of Pathologists in 2014 and is the College's second female president.

Clinical practice 

Lishman is a consultant cellular pathologist at Peterborough City Hospital. She is Head of Department and lead pathologist for the local bowel cancer screening programme.

Achievements 

In addition to her election as President of the Royal College of Pathologists, she was named one of the fifty most inspirational women in healthcare in 2013 by the Health Service Journal which described her as the 'public face of pathology' and 'the most outward facing person from that specialism'.

References 

1960s births
British pathologists
Alumni of Girton College, Cambridge
Living people
Commanders of the Order of the British Empire
Alumni of the London Hospital Medical College
People educated at King's Ely